Bohdan Krawchenko (born 29 December 1946) is the former director of the Canadian Institute of Ukrainian Studies of the University of Alberta, Canada. and former vice-rector of the National Academy for Public Administration under the President of Ukraine in Kyiv, Ukraine.

Career

Dr Krawchenko moved to Ukraine in 1991 to become Director of Policy Studies at the Council of Advisors to the Verkhovna Rada of Ukraine 1992 became the founder and director of the Institute of Public Administration and Local Government, Cabinet of Ministers. 
In 1995 the institute was re-organised into the Academy of Public Administration, Office of the President of Ukraine and he was appointed vice-rector for academic development and Director of the Centre for the Study of Administration Reform. Dr. Krawchenko participated in numerous Ukrainian government committees, task forces, and working groups. These include the President's Council on Social and Economic Affairs, the Policy Unit of the Cabinet of Ministers, the Working Group on the Establishment of the Civil Service, the Working Group on Monetary Reform, and the Commission on Administrative Reform. He has also served as a consultant to the World Bank and OECD. He was visiting associate professor at Harvard University, Department of Government, and visiting professor at the College of Europe in Natolin, Poland.

Dr Krawchenko was editor of “Occasional Papers in Public Administration and Public Policy” published by the Network of Institutes and Schools of Public Administration in Central and Eastern Europe, and a member of international editorial boards of several journals, amongst which was Public Management and Journal of Comparative Policy Analysis.

In 2004 Dr Krawchenko joined the University of Central Asia, where he currently serves as the Advisor to the Rector; Senior Research Fellow at the Graduate School of Development. Previously he was appointed as the Dean of the Graduate School of Development in 2004-2022 and also as UCA's Director-General from 2007 to 2014.

Awards
He received an honorary doctorate from the University of North London in 1995.
In 1997 he was made an honorary professor of the University of ‘Kyiv-Mohyla Academy’.
In 2000 he received an honorary doctorate from the Ukrainian Academy of Public Administration.
In 2000 he was awarded an Order of Merit from the President of Ukraine. Dr Krawchenko was editor of “Occasional Papers in Public Administration and Public Policy” published by the Network of Institutes and Schools of Public Administration in Central and Eastern Europe, and a member of international editorial boards of several journals among them Public Management and Journal of Comparative Policy Analysis.

Writing
He is the author of Social Change and National Consciousness in Twentieth-Century Ukraine (1985). 
A specialist on Ukraine, Dr. Krawchenko edited Ukraine after Shelest (1983), Famine in Ukraine 1932–1933 (1986), and Ukrainian Past, Ukrainian Present (1993).

Research Publications 

 Universities and Society in Kyrgyzstan: A Historical, Political and Economic Perspective (2021).
 The Impact of Industrialization on the Social Structure of Ukraine (2015).
 Agrarian Unrest and the Shaping of a National Identity in Ukraine at the Turn of the Twentieth Century (2001).
 Social Change and National Consciousness in Twentieth-Century Ukraine (1985).
 Ukrainian Society after the Second World War (1985).

References

Living people
Historians of Ukraine
20th-century Ukrainian historians
1946 births
People from Günzburg
21st-century Ukrainian historians
Academic staff of the University of Alberta
German people of Ukrainian descent
German expatriates in Ukraine
German academic administrators
German expatriates in Canada